Mirror carp, regionally known as Israeli carp, are a type of domesticated fish commonly found in Europe but widely introduced or cultivated elsewhere. They are a variety of the common carp (Cyprinus carpio) developed through selective breeding. The name "mirror carp" originates from their scales' resemblance to mirrors. They can grow in excess of  – the last few British record fish have all been mirror carp.

Description
Common carp have an even, regular scale pattern, whereas mirrors have irregular, patchy scales that have little to no overlap, making many fish unique and identifiable by sight.

Leather carp are another variety of common carp that resemble mirror carp, but are permitted a few scales either along the dorsal line or the wrist of the tail.

Genetics
The most striking difference between mirror and common carp is the presence of large mirror-like scales on the former. The mirror-scale phenotype is caused by a genetic mutation present at one of two scale trait loci, denoted by their S and N alleles, respectively. The genotype that produces a mirror scale phenotype is "ssnn" (all recessive), while wild-type carp may have either SSnn or Ssnn genotype.  The "S" locus has been identified as containing the gene encoding fibroblast growth factor receptor Fgfr1A1, which was duplicated during the course of carp evolution and consequently does not typically produce lethal phenotypes when only one locus is mutated.   The "N" locus has not been identified, but is hypothesized to have bearing on the development of embryonic mesenchyme.

Contrary to popular belief, a leather carp is not always a mirror carp without scales.  Similar to mirror carp, leather, or "nude" carp, are homozygous recessive at the "S" locus, but unlike mirror carp, true leather carp are heterozygous for a dominant mutant allele at the "N" locus (ssNn genotype). Leather carp also have reduced numbers of red blood cells and slower growth rates than scaled carp. Mirror carp from Hungarian and Asian stocks have been observed to have fewer pharyngeal teeth than scaled carp, while nude carp had fewer still.

A population of mirror carp in Madagascar (there an invasive species) was found to have reverted to full scale cover after being introduced from France in the early twentieth century.  The feral Malagasy carp still possessed large scales due to their mirror phenotype, but had increased scale coverage approaching that of wild-type carp.  Hubert et al. (2016) found that the recessive allele at the "S" locus was still fixed in the population.  They believe that the phenotypic reversion was due to compensation by quantitative trait loci as a result of a selective disadvantage for partial scaling in the wild, perhaps related to an impairment in parasite resistance.

Fishing

Anglers pursue larger leather carp due to their rarity.

See also 
 Carp
 Japanese white crucian carp

Notes

References

External links 

 Carp Fishingeye - information about Mirror carp fishing
  Galleries of Mirror & Common carp & UK carp fishing venues
  Photographs of Mirror carp caught at fishing venue in France
  The British Record Mirror Carp

Carp

de:Spiegelkarpfen
it:Carpa specchio
ja:カガミゴイ